Greater Kuching refers to the urbanised areas surrounding the metropolitan city of Kuching in Malaysia. Kuching is the capital of the state of Sarawak and is the largest city in the state. The area comprising a total area of 2030.94 square kilometres.

Greater Kuching was fully inspired from Greater Kuala Lumpur, but only in Sarawak. The economic centre and focus point of Kuching is a small area by the coast known as the Kuching Central Business District (also known as Kuching CBD) or Kuching City Centre. 

In June 2022, Premier of Sarawak, Abang Abdul Rahman Johari Abang Openg announced the plan to set up Greater Kuching Coordinated Development Agency (GKCDA) to coordinate all development projects in the area, including Kuching, Samarahan, Serian, and the upcoming two new district area (Bau and Balai Ringin).

References 

Kuching
K